Stanisław Gabriel Worcell (26 March 1799 in Stepań/Volhynia –  3 February 1857 in London) was a socialist Polish revolutionary.

He lived in France, England, and Jersey.

On August 11, 1831, he was awarded the Silver Cross of the Virtuti Militari.

He is buried on the western side of Highgate Cemetery.

External links 
 Stanisław Gabriel Worcell (Polish)

1799 births
1857 deaths
Polish revolutionaries
Recipients of the Silver Cross of the Virtuti Militari